2P may refer to:


Science
2P/Encke, official designation of Comet Encke
2p, an arm of Chromosome 2 (human)
2p, an atomic orbital for electrons
Two-photon absorption
Two-photon excitation microscopy

Transportation
Airphil Express, a Philippines airline, IATA code 2P
LMS Class 2P 4-4-0, a British locomotive

Other
2P, a 408mm artillery piece from the Soviet Union
2p, a two pence British coin
2P, rapper 2 Pistols
2P reserves, proven reserves of fossil fuels

See also
P2 (disambiguation)